This is a list of schools in Tai Po District, Hong Kong.

Secondary schools

 Government
 New Territories Heung Yee Kuk Tai Po District Secondary School

 Aided
  (神召會康樂中學)
  (佛教大光慈航中學)
  (迦密聖道中學)
 Carmel Pak U Secondary School
 CCC Fung Leung Kit Memorial Secondary School (中華基督教會馮梁結紀念中學)
  (中華聖潔會靈風中學)
  (孔教學院大成何郭佩珍中學)
  (港九街坊婦女會孫方中書院)
 Hong Kong Teachers' Association Lee Heng Kwei Secondary School (香港教師會李興貴中學)
  (香港紅卍字會大埔卍慈中學)
 Hong Kong Taoist Association The Yuen Yuen Institute No. 2 Secondary School
  (救恩書院)
  (靈糧堂劉梅軒中學)
 Salem-Immanuel Lutheran College
 SKH Bishop Mok Sau Tseng Secondary School
 
 Wong Shiu Chi Secondary School

 Direct Subsidy Scheme
 Law Ting Pong Secondary School (羅定邦中學)
 Tai Po Sam Yuk Secondary School (大埔三育中學)

 Private
 American School Hong Kong
 Assembly of God Hebron Evening School (神召會康樂夜中學)
 Hong Kong Teacher Association Evening Secondary School (香港教師會夜中學)
 Malvern College Hong Kong
 Tai Kwong Hilary College (大光德萃書院)

Primary schools

 Government
 Tai Po Government Primary School (大埔官立小學)

 Aided
 The Education University of Hong Kong Jockey Club Primary School (香港教育大學賽馬會小學)
 Hong Kong and Kowloon Kaifong Women's Association (HKKKWA) Sun Fong Chung Primary School (港九街坊婦女會孫方中小學)
 HKTA Wun Tsuen Ng Lai Wo Memorial School (香港道教聯合會雲泉吳禮和紀念學校)
 Lam Tsuen Public Wong Fook Luen Memorial School (林村公立黃福鑾紀念學校)
 NTW&JWA Leung Sing Tak Primary School (新界婦孺福利會有限公司梁省德學校)
 NTWJWA Christian Remembrance of Grace Primary School (新界婦孺福利會基督教銘恩小學)
 PLK Tin Ka Ping Millennium Primary School (保良局田家炳千禧小學)
 PLK Tin Ka Ping Primary School (保良局田家炳小學)
 S.K.H. Yuen Chen Maun Chen Jubilee Primary School (聖公會阮鄭夢芹銀禧小學)
 Sacred Heart of Mary Catholic Primary School (天主教聖母聖心小學)
 Sam Shui Natives Association Huen King Wing School (三水同鄉會禤景榮學校)
 SKH Yuen Chen Maun Chen Primary School (聖公會阮鄭夢芹小學)
 Sung Tak Wong Kin Sheung Memorial School (大埔崇德黃建常紀念學校)
 Tai Po Baptist Public School (大埔浸信會公立學校)
 Tai Po Methodist School (大埔循道衛理小學)
 Tai Po Old Market Public School (Plover Clove) (大埔舊墟公立學校（寶湖道）)
 Tai Po Old Market Public School (大埔舊墟公立學校)
 YCH Choi Hin To Primary School (仁濟醫院蔡衍濤小學)

 Private
 American School Hong Kong
 Hong Kong Japanese School Tai Po Campus/Japanese International School
 International College Hong Kong Hong Lok Yuen (Primary Section)
 Malvern College Hong Kong
 Norwegian International School
 Spanish Primary School
 The Spanish Primary School, which has education in Spanish, English, and Mandarin under the National Curriculum for England, was organised by Adriana Chan. It opened in September 2017.
 St Hilary's Primary School (德萃小學)

Special schools

 Aided
 Hong Chi Pinehill School (匡智松嶺學校)
 Hong Chi Pinehill No. 2 School (匡智松嶺第二校)
 Hong Chi Pinehill No. 3 School (匡智松嶺第三校
 Hong Kong Red Cross Hospital Schools Alice Ho Miu Ling Nethersole Hospital (香港紅十字會醫院學校)
 SAHK Jockey Club Elaine Field School (香港耀能協會賽馬會田綺玲學校)

Closed

References

Lists of schools in Hong Kong
Tai Po District